The second election to the Representative Assembly (French: Assemblée représentative) was held on 16 December 1951 to constitute the Second Representative Assembly of French India.

Results

See also
 1946 French India Representative Assembly election
 1955 Pondicherry Representative Assembly election
 1959 Pondicherry Representative Assembly election

References

State Assembly elections in Puducherry
Elections in France
1951 elections in India
1951 in French India